The 1868 United States presidential election in Oregon took place on November 3, 1868, as part of the 1868 United States presidential election. Voters chose three representatives, or electors to the Electoral College, who voted for president and vice president.

Oregon voted for the Democratic nominee, Horatio Seymour over the Republican nominee, Ulysses S. Grant. Seymour won the state by a narrow margin of 0.74%.

As a result of his win, Seymour became the first Democratic presidential candidate to ever win Oregon. Another Democrat would not win Oregon again on a presidential level until Woodrow Wilson won the state in 1912.

This was the only time a Republican would win a Presidential election without Oregon until 1988, 120 years later. In addition to Grant in this election and George H.W. Bush in 1988, the younger Bush in 2000 and 2004 as well as Donald Trump in 2016 won without the state.

Results

See also
 United States presidential elections in Oregon

References

Oregon
1868
1868 Oregon elections